Michael Roth may refer to:

 Michael Roth (baseball) (born 1990), British-American baseball player
 Michael Roth (cyberneticist) (1936–2019), German engineer
 Michael Roth (handball) (born 1962), German handball player
 Michael Roth (politician) (born 1970), German politician and Minister of State for Europe at the German Federal Foreign Office
 Michael S. Roth (born 1957), American academic administrator
 Mike Roth, A&R man who discovered and developed numerous famous Canadian bands

See also 
 Wolff-Michael Roth (born 1953), scientist at the University of Victoria